Ilarie is a Romanian-language masculine given name that may refer to:

Ilarie Chendi
Ilarie Voronca

See also
"Ilariê", a Brazilian pop song

Romanian masculine given names